Stick-Up! is an album by the jazz vibraphonist Bobby Hutcherson, released on the Blue Note label in 1968. The album is Hutcherson's first without drummer Joe Chambers. Billy Higgins took over on drums on the recording session. It also features Joe Henderson and is the first recorded meeting of the vibrist and pianist McCoy Tyner. Five of the six tracks are Hutcherson compositions, with the exception being Ornette Coleman's "Una Muy Bonita".

Track listing
All compositions by Bobby Hutcherson except as noted.
 "Una Muy Bonita" (Coleman) - 6:27
 "8/4 Beat" - 6:59
 "Summer Nights" - 6:59
 "Black Circle" - 6:57
 "Verse" - 9:32
 "Blues Mind Matter" - 3:32

Personnel
Bobby Hutcherson - vibraphone
Joe Henderson - tenor saxophone (except track 3)
McCoy Tyner - piano
Herbie Lewis - bass
Billy Higgins - drums

Charts

References 

1968 albums
Blue Note Records albums
Bobby Hutcherson albums
Albums produced by Alfred Lion
Albums recorded at Van Gelder Studio